József Gregor (born 30 November 1963) is a retired Hungarian football striker. He became Nemzeti Bajnokság I top goalscorer in 1990–91 and was capped for Hungary.

References

1963 births
Living people
Hungarian footballers
Budapest Honvéd FC players
Siófok KC players
Ferencvárosi TC footballers
Nemzeti Bajnokság I players
Nemzeti Bajnokság II players
Nemzeti Bajnokság III players
Association football forwards
Hungary international footballers
Footballers from Budapest